The Gold Coast Private Hospital is a private hospital facility in Southport, Gold Coast that replaced Allamanda Private Hospital from 12 March 2016. The $230 million facility opened with 284 beds and 13 operating theatres with capacity to expand to 400 beds and 21 theatres, in line with demand.

The Emergency Care Centre is open 24/7 and is headed by Dr Anthony Padowitz

The hospital is co-located with the Gold Coast University Hospital and Griffith University and is a key partner in the Gold Coast Health and Knowledge Precinct.

Location 
Gold Coast Private Hospital is located in the Gold Coast Health and Knowledge Precinct on 14 Hill Street, Southport. The Smith Street Motorway is located nearby.

Public Transport 
The Griffith University G:link (Gold Coast light rail) station is across the road from the new hospital with trams running as frequent as 8 minutes during peak times.

A bus stop located adjacent to the tram station provides bus connection to Helensvale railway station and Southport.

See Translink for information on services and times regarding bus and tram transport

Facility Services 
The hospital provides services relating to:

 Anaesthetics
 Bariatric surgery
 Breast surgery
 Cardiac surgery
 Cardiology
 Colorectal surgery
 Dermatology
 Ear, nose and throat surgery
 24-hour emergency department 
 Emergency care Centre - 
 Endocrine surgery
 Endocrinology
 Gastroenterology
 General surgery
 Gynaecologic oncology
 Gynaecology
 Haematology and oncology
 Infectious diseases
 Intensive care
 IVF
 Maternity
 Neurology
 Neurosurgery
 Neonatal intensive care
 Oncology
 Ophthalmology
 Oral and maxillofacial surgery
 Orthopaedics
 Paediatrics medicine
 Paediatric surgery
 Plastic surgery
 Rehabilitation
 Renal physician
 Renal dialysis
 Respiratory medicine
 Rheumatology
 Robotic surgery
 Sleep studies
 Thoracic surgery
 Urogynaecology
 Urology
 Vascular surgery

References  

2016 establishments in Australia
Buildings and structures on the Gold Coast, Queensland
Hospitals established in 2016
Hospitals in Queensland
Private hospitals in Australia
Southport, Queensland